Ulmus 'Morton Glossy' (selling name ) is a hybrid cultivar raised by the Morton Arboretum, Illinois. Tested in the US National Elm Trial coordinated by Colorado State University,   averaged a survival rate of 86% after 10 years.  was introduced to the UK in 2006 by the Frank P. Matthews nursery in Worcestershire.

Description
 has been promoted in the United States as "strong and symmetrical" in growth and habit  . However, its performance in the southern United States has not impressed, and it was dismissed as "ugly" by Michael Dirr, Professor of Horticulture at the University of Georgia , on account of its "wild" growth and splaying branches. It is similar in stature to the American Elm and has leaves that are a deep glossy green when mature, < 10 cm in length by 5 cm broad, with rough upper surface and finely toothed margins. The samara is comparatively small, < 10 mm long by 8 mm wide, the seed central. In trials in the UK,  was found to be the first elm cultivar to flush in spring, and the first to shed its leaves in the fall, usually by early October. The tree grew poorly on thin soils over clay, which became very dry in summer, but excelled on floodplain alluvium subjected to brief periods of inundation in winter.

Pests and diseases
 has a resistance to Dutch elm disease, but is highly susceptible to attack by elm leaf beetle Xanthogaleruca luteola    and Japanese beetle.

Cultivation
In commerce,  is usually propagated by grafting onto an Ulmus pumila rootstock. The tree, under its original name of 'Charisma', featured in the elm trials  conducted by Northern Arizona University at Holbrook, eastern Arizona.  is very cold-hardy; in artificial freezing tests at the arboretum  the LT50 (temp. at which 50% of tissues die) was found to be −40 °C.

The tree is currently being evaluated in the National Elm Trial coordinated by Colorado State University.  was briefly in commerce in the UK, where 180 trees were sold in 2006; several specimens were acquired for assessment by Butterfly Conservation in Hampshire.

Synonymy
'Charisma': initial name accorded until 1995.

Accessions
North America
Arnold Arboretum, US. Acc. no. 132–2002
Bartlett Tree Experts, US. Acc. nos. 2001–104, 2001–105
Bickelhaupt Arboretum, US. Acc. no. 02–038
Chicago Botanic Garden, US. Planted in the Parking Lots, no other details available.
Dawes Arboretum , US. 3 trees. No acc. details available.
Morton Arboretum, US. Acc. nos. 135–94, 523–99, 212–2004, 497–2004, 630–2004, 1090–2004.
Parker Arboretum, US. No acc. details.
University of Idaho Arboretum, US. Two trees. Acc. no. 2000091
Europe
Grange Farm Arboretum, UK. Acc. details not known. 
Sir Harold Hillier Gardens, UK.  Acc. no: 2007.0260
Royal Botanic Garden Edinburgh, UK. Acc. no. 20070379

Nurseries
North America
Acorn Farms , Galena, Ohio, US.
Bailey Nurseries , St. Paul, Minnesota, US.
Carlton Plants, LLC , Dayton, Oregon, US.
Charles J. Fiore , Prairie View, Illinois, US.
Johnson's Nursery , Menomonee Falls, Wisconsin, US.
North American Plants  , Lafayette, Oregon, US.
Sester Farms , Gresham, Oregon, US.
Sun Valley Garden Centre , Eden Prairie, Minnesota, US.

References

External links
http://fletcher.ces.state.nc.us/programs/nursery/metria/metria11/warren/elm.htm  Warren, K., J. Frank Schmidt & Son Co. (2002).  The Status of Elms in the Nursery Industry in 2000.
http://www.mortonarb.org/plantinfo/plantclinic/phc/New-Elms-For-The-Landscape.pdf. Miller, F. (2002). New elms for the landscape and urban forest.
http://www.hfrr.k-state.edu/DesktopModules/ViewDocument.aspx?DocumentID=1619  Dutch Elm Disease. Kansas State University.

Hybrid elm cultivar
Ulmus articles with images
Ulmus